Matías Ezequiel Medina (born 11 April 1998) is an Argentine professional footballer who plays as an attacking midfielder for 9 Julio Chacab.

Club Career
Medina had a youth spell with CEFAR, before joining Chacarita Juniors at the age of thirteen. Five years after joining, Medina was called up for the first-team after being an unused substitute for a Primera B Nacional match with Instituto on 27 August 2016. Almost a year later, in July 2017, he made his professional debut in a Copa Argentina loss to Guillermo Brown. On 2 August 2018, Deportivo Armenio signed Medina on loan. He made six appearances in Primera C Metropolitana as they secured promotion to Primera B Metropolitana.

Medina returned to Characarita in June 2019, remaining until January 2020 when he would terminate his contract. A move to 9 Julio Chacab soon followed.

International Career
He received a call-up for the Argentina U17 team in October 2014.

Career Statistics
.

References

External links

1998 births
Living people
People from Vicente López Partido
Argentine footballers
Association football midfielders
Primera C Metropolitana players
Chacarita Juniors footballers
Deportivo Armenio footballers
Sportspeople from Buenos Aires Province